Christine Jeanne Ourmières-Widener   (born 21 September 1964) is a French businesswoman who last served as Chief Executive Officer of TAP Air Portugal.

Career
She worked at Air France from 1988, where she started in the maintenance team for the Concorde. Subsequently appointed UK and Ireland Managing Director for Air France, she was then named Chief Executive of the Irish airline CityJet, after it was bought by Air France, from 1 October 2010 to 2015. She was for some time part of the European Regions Airline Association.

On 20 December 2016, it was announced that she was joining Flybe. She was the first woman elected to the board of 31 members. She had been appointed interim director on 24 April 2017, when Fernando Pinto stepped down.

On 24 June 2021, Ourmières-Widener was appointed CEO of Portugal's flag carrier TAP Air Portugal.

During her tenant as CEO of TAP Air Portugal, the company went through restructuring and observed positive financial growth which was also boosted by the end of COVID-19 restrictions schemes on travel of passengers.

However, such endeavours were tarnished in 2022 with scandals, culminating with the Alexandra Reis case. Reis, a state secretary of Treasure who was a board member of TAP Air Portugal then dismissed by Ourmières-Widener without the latter publicly disclosing the nature of this action, left the company with agreement on a hefty severance pay (over €500,000, to compensate the remainder of her full 4 year term contract with paid holidays) to work on NAV, another state-subsidised institute, which evoked public outcry on Portuguese society.

Political pressure led to the dismissal of Pedro Nuno Santos, minister of the Ministry of Infrastructure and Housing (Portugal), a cabinet directly involved with the ownership of TAP and who gave approval to the dismissal of Reis.

On 6 March 2023, weeks after the public inquiry in the portuguese Parliament about the Alexandra Reis case, and the final audit report from IGF (Inspeção-Geral de Finanças), the government dismissed her from executive duties with no severance pay.

References

External links
 
 

1964 births
French airline chief executives
ESSEC Business School alumni
Fellows of the Royal Aeronautical Society
Fellows of the Royal Academy of Engineering
Female Fellows of the Royal Academy of Engineering
French women chief executives
French women engineers
Businesspeople from Avignon
Living people
21st-century women engineers